The 1904–05 İstanbul Football League season was the first season of the league. HMS Imogene FC won the league for the first time.

Season

References
 1904-1905 İstanbul Futbol Ligi. Türk Futbol Tarihi vol.1. page(28). (June 1992) Türkiye Futbol Federasyonu Yayınları.

Istanbul
Istanbul
Istanbul Football League seasons